The Diocese of Rapid City is a Latin Church ecclesiastical territory or diocese of the Catholic Church in western South Dakota, United States. It is a suffragan in the ecclesiastical province of the metropolitan Archdiocese of Saint Paul and Minneapolis. The cathedra is found within the Cathedral of Our Lady of Perpetual Help in the episcopal see of Rapid City. Peter Michael Muhich was installed as bishop of this see on July 9, 2020.

The diocese encompasses all South Dakota counties west of the Missouri River: Corson, Dewey, Stanley, Lyman, Gregory, Tripp, Todd, Bennett, Oglala Lakota, Fall River, Custer, Pennington, Lawrence, Meade, Butte, Harding, Perkins, Ziebach, Haakon, Jackson, Jones, and Mellette.

History
On August 6, 1902, Saint Pius X established the diocese as the Diocese of Lead.  Its territory was taken from the Diocese of Sioux Falls.  The name of the diocese was changed by Pope Pius XI on August 1, 1930, when the see city was transferred to Rapid City.

Reports of sex abuse

On March 15, 2019, the Diocese of Rapid City published a list of 21 Catholic clergy who were credibly accused of committing acts of sex abuse while serving in schools, churches, hospitals and on the Pine Ridge and Rosebud reservations from 1951 to 2018. The list was accompanied by a letter written by then-Rapid City Bishop Robert D. Gruss, which stated that "It is important to acknowledge the horrid truth of past abuse in the church so that we can repent of these actions and to recommit ourselves to ensuring that no one is hurt moving forward."

On August 7, 2020, the Rapid City Diocese had received an allegation that recent vicar Michel Mulloy sexually abused a minor in the 1980s. This led to Mulloy's resignation before he was consecrated from his recent appointment as bishop of the Roman Catholic Diocese of Duluth, Minnesota. Mulloy was reported to be no longer active in the Diocese of Rapid City.

John Praveen, a priest and native of Hyderabad, India, had joined the Diocese of Rapid City for a 10-year assignment in December 2017. The Diocese of Rapid City sponsored Praveen's visa. Upon arriving, Praveen first worked in Eagle Butte on the Cheyenne River Sioux Tribe reservation. He was transferred to the Cathedral of Our Lady of Perpetual Help in June 2018.

He worked at the cathedral until he was arrested and charged on October 2, 2018, on sex abuse charges. Following the arrest of Praveen, Bishop Robert Gruss stripped Praveen of both his clerical attire and priestly duties; he ordered him to live a life of prayer and penance under the supervision of the Rapid City bishop. On November 12, 2020, Pope Francis laicized Praveen.

On November 25, 2020, the Church reported that federal sex abuse and child pornography charges were pending against Fr. Marcin Garbacz. He was already serving a 7.75-year prison sentence for stealing from the Diocese of Rapid City.

Bishops

Ordinaries
The bishops of the diocese and their terms of service:

Bishops of Lead
 John Stariha (1902–1909) 
 Joseph Francis Busch (1910–1915), appointed Bishop of Saint Cloud
 John Jeremiah Lawler (1915–1930 see below)

Bishops of Rapid City
 John Jeremiah Lawler (see above 1930–1948)
 William Tibertus McCarty, C.Ss.R. (1948–1969)
 Harold Joseph Dimmerling (1969–1987)
 Charles Joseph Chaput, O.F.M. Cap. (1988–1997), appointed Archbishop of Denver and later Archbishop of Philadelphia
 Blase Joseph Cupich (1998–2010), appointed Bishop of Spokane and later Archbishop of Chicago (elevated to Cardinal in 2016)
 Robert Dwayne Gruss (2011–2019), appointed Bishop of Saginaw
 Peter Michael Muhich (2020–present)

Coadjutor bishop
 Leo Ferdinand Dworschak (1946-1947), did not succeed to this see; appointed auxiliary bishop of Fargo in 1947

Other priests of the diocese who became bishops
Lawrence Welsh, appointed Bishop of Spokane in 1978
Steven Biegler, appointed Bishop of Cheyenne in 2017

Schools
Red Cloud Indian School (Maȟpíya Lúta Owáyawa), Pine Ridge Reservation
Red Cloud High School (Maȟpíya Lúta Waŋkáwapȟaya Owáyawa), Pine Ridge (9-12)
Red Cloud Elementary and Middle School (Maȟpíya Lúta Hukhúčiyela Owáyawa), Pine Ridge (K-8)
Our Lady of Lourdes Elementary (Wíŋyaŋ Wakȟáŋ Owáyawa), Porcupine (K-8)
Rapid City Catholic School System, Rapid City
St. Thomas More High School (9-12)
St. Thomas More Middle School (6-8)
St. Elizabeth Seton Elementary (K-5)
St. Elizabeth Ann Seton Child Development (3K-PK)
St. Francis Mission, Rosebud Indian Reservation
Sapa Un Catholic Academy, St. Francis (K-8)

See also
 Catholic Church in the United States
 Ecclesiastical Province of Saint Paul and Minneapolis
 List of Roman Catholic dioceses (structured view) (including archdioceses)
 List of the Catholic dioceses of the United States

References

External links
Roman Catholic Diocese of Rapid City Official Site

 
Rapid City
Christian organizations established in 1902
Diocese of Rapid City
Rapid City
Rapid City
1902 establishments in South Dakota